Hamid Reza Tizhoosh (born 1962) is an Iranian-Canadian artificial intelligence researcher, working on radiology, and pathology data. He is a Professor of Biomedical Informatics at the Mayo Clinic's Department of Artificial Intelligence and Informatics. Tizhoosh is also the founder and director of the Kimia Lab (Laboratory for Knowledge Inference in Medical Image Analysis) at the University of Waterloo.

Life
Tizhoosh was born in 1962 in Iran. He received his master's degree in Electrical Engineering, with a major in Technical Computer Science, from the University of Aachen in 1996 and received his Doctorate in Medical Image Analysis from the Otto von Guericke University Magdeburg in 2000.

He first began his career by analyzing radiography images in 1996, as a Ph.D. student in Germany. He participated in a European Union initiative, as it was a partnership between many European institutions, including Lyon, Manchester, Liverpool, and Magdeburg, to learn more about field of radiation treatment. He immigrated to Canada in 2000. In 2021, Tizhoosh Joined Mayo Clinic as Professor of Biomedical Informatics, and researching on applications of artificial intelligence (AI) in medicine.

Research 
Before joining the University of Waterloo, he was a research associate at the University of Toronto's Knowledge and Intelligence Systems Laboratory, where he focused on dynamic bandwidth allocation utilizing AI approaches such as reinforcement learning.

In 2001, Tizhoosh joined University of Waterloo and in 2013 he founded Kimia Lab, researching on applications of AI for medical image search. In 2021, he and his fellow researchers developed a new technology providing clinicians with a simple tool for diagnosing, treating, and researching disease by searching enormous medical image archives.The image retrieval technology, which is called Yottixel, later it was adapted by Joint Pathology Center.

Selected publications

Journal articles

References

Artificial intelligence researchers

RWTH Aachen University alumni
Otto von Guericke University Magdeburg alumni
21st-century Canadian scientists
Academic staff of the University of Waterloo
Academic staff of the University of Toronto
Mayo Clinic people
Iranian emigrants to Canada
Iranian expatriate academics
Expatriate academics in the United States
1962 births
Living people